Marko Bulat may refer to:

 Marko Bulat (singer) (born 1973), Serbian pop-folk singer and musician
 Marko Bulat (footballer, born 1997), Serbian football defender
 Marko Bulat (footballer, born 2001), Croatian football midfielder